Coldwater High School is a public high school in Coldwater, Michigan with approximately 1000 students.  It is part of the Coldwater Community School district and is fully accredited by the North Central Association of Colleges and Schools.

Athletics
Coldwater High School mascot is the cardinal.  Coldwater is a Class A school in the MHSAA that participates in the Interstate Eight Athletic Conference (I-8) with Hastings, Harper Creek, Jackson Northwest, Jackson Lumen Christi, Marshall, Parma Western, and Pennfield.  For many years Coldwater's main rival was Sturgis for whom they played against in the Twin Valley and SMAC-East.  In football, the two schools played for the "Silver Football" every year until 2013 when the two schools left the SMAC-East and Sturgis joined the Wolverine Conference.

Sports sponsored by Coldwater High School include:

Baseball (boys)
Basketball (boys and girls)
Bowling (boys and girls)
Cross Country (boys and girls)
Football (boys)
Golf (boys and girls)
Gymnastics (girls)
Sideline Cheer
Soccer (boys and girls)
Softball (girls)
Swimming and Diving (boys and girls)
Tennis (boys and girls)
Track and Field (boys and girls)
Volleyball (girls)
Wrestling (boys)

State titles
1949—Boys Basketball
1994—Boys Golf
1999—Girls Golf
2000—Girls Golf
2001—Girls Golf
2005—Girls Bowling
2006—Girls Bowling
2007—Girls Bowling
2018- Boys Track and Field

Notable alumni

 Scott Brayton – IRL Race Car Driver
 Alice Haylett (Class of 1940) – AAGPBL All-Star pitcher
 Jeff Kellogg – MLB umpire
 Tim Welke –  MLB umpire

References

External links

Public high schools in Michigan
Educational institutions established in 1862
Schools in Branch County, Michigan
1862 establishments in Michigan
Coldwater, Michigan